The 21st Century Guide to King Crimson – Volume Two – 1981–2003 is a compilation album by the highly influential English progressive rock band King Crimson, containing the best-known songs from the group's 1981–2003 phase. No material from the album the construKction of light (2000) was included in this box set. It was released in 2005.

Track listing

Disc One: In the Studio: 1981–1984
All songs written by Adrian Belew, Bill Bruford, Robert Fripp, and Tony Levin, except where noted.

 "Elephant Talk" – 4:44
 "Frame by Frame" – 5:08
 "Matte Kudasai" – 3:46
 "Thela Hun Ginjeet" – 6:26
 "The Sheltering Sky" – 8:23
 "Discipline" – 5:02
 "Heartbeat" – 3:54
 "Waiting Man" – 4:26
 "Neurotica" – 4:49
 "Requiem" – 6:36
 "Three of a Perfect Pair" – 4:10
 "Sleepless" – 5:24

Bonus tracks: 1983–2004
 "The King Crimson Barber Shop" (Levin) – 1:36
 "Form No. 1" (Fripp (???)) – 3:03
 "Bude" (Belew) – 0:25
 "Potato Pie" (abridged) (Belew, Fripp, Trey Gunn, Pat Mastelotto) – 4:33
 "Clouds" (Belew) – 0:33
 "Einstein's Relatives" (Belew, Fripp, Gunn, Mastelotto) – 3:08
Tracks 1–6 from Discipline (1981)
Tracks 7–10 from Beat (1982)
Tracks 11–12 from Three of a Perfect Pair (1984)
Bonus track 1 from Frame by Frame: The Essential King Crimson, Heartbeat: The Abbreviated King Crimson (both from 1991), and the 2001 reissue of Three of a Perfect Pair
Bonus tracks 3–6 from the Happy with What You Have to Be Happy With EP (2002)
Bonus track 2 previously unreleased (2005)

Disc Two: Live: 1981–1984
All songs written by Belew, Bruford, Fripp, and Levin.

 "Entry of the Crims" (Live at Le Spectrum, Montreal, Quebec, Canada, 11 July 1984) – 4:42
 "Larks' Tongues in Aspic Part III" (Abridged) (Live at Le Spectrum, Montreal, Quebec, Canada, 11 July 1984) – 2:47
 "Thela Hun Ginjeet" (Live at Le Spectrum, Montreal, Quebec, Canada, 11 July 1984) – 5:54
 "Matte Kudasai" (Live at Le Spectrum, Montreal, Quebec, Canada, 11 July 1984) – 3:40
 "The Sheltering Sky" (Live at the Arena, Fréjus, France, 27 August 1982) – 10:32
 "Neal and Jack and Me" (Live at the Arena, Frejus, France, 27 August 1982) – 5:39
 "Indiscipline" (Live at Le Spectrum, Montreal, Quebec, Canada, 11 July 1984) – 8:10
 "Sartori in Tangier" (Live at Le Spectrum, Montreal, Quebec, Canada, 11 July 1984) – 4:21
 "Frame by Frame" (Live at Le Spectrum, Montreal, Quebec, Canada, 11 July 1984) – 3:55
 "Man with an Open Heart" (Live at Le Spectrum, Montreal, Quebec, Canada, 11 July 1984) – 3:40
 "Waiting Man" (Live at Le Spectrum, Montreal, Quebec, Canada, 11 July 1984) – 6:00
 "Sleepless" (Live at Le Spectrum, Montreal, Quebec, Canada, 11 July 1984) – 6:11
 "Three of a Perfect Pair" (Live at Le Spectrum, Montreal, Quebec, Canada, 11 July 1984) – 4:24
 "Discipline" (Live at Le Spectrum, Montreal, Quebec, Canada, 11 July 1984) – 4:52
 "Elephant Talk" (Live at the Arena, Cap D'Agde, Agde, France, 26 August 1982) – 5:02
Tracks 1–4 & 7–14 from Absent Lovers: Live in Montreal (1998)
Tracks 5–6 from Neal and Jack and Me (2004)
Track 15 from Live at Cap D'Agde (1999)

Disc Three: In the Studio 1995–2003
Tracks 1–8 written by Belew, Bruford, Fripp, Gunn, Levin, and Mastelotto and tracks 9–18 written by Belew, Fripp, Gunn, and Mastelotto, except where noted.

 "VROOOM" – 4:48
 "Coda: Marine 475" – 2:41
 "Dinosaur" – 6:37
 "Walking on Air" – 4:38
 "B'Boom" – 4:11
 "THRAK" (Abridged) – 0:43
 "Fearless and Highly THRaKked" (Abridged) – 3:50
 "Sex Sleep Eat Drink Dream" – 4:44
 "Radio II" (Abridged) – 0:43
 "The Power to Believe I: A Cappella" (Belew) – 0:43
 "Level Five" – 7:15
 "Eyes Wide Open" – 4:10
 "Elektrik" – 8:00
 "Facts of Life: Intro" – 1:38
 "Facts of Life" – 5:05
 "The Power to Believe II: Power Circle" – 7:44
 "Happy with What You Have to Be Happy With" – 3:30
 "The Power to Believe III: The Deception of the Thrush" – 4:12
 "The Power to Believe IV: Coda" (Fripp) – 2:24
Tracks 1–6, 8–9 from THRAK (1995)
Track 7 from THRaKaTTaK (1996)
Tracks from 10–19 from The Power to Believe (2003)

Disc Four: Live: 1994–2003
 "VROOOM VROOOM" (Belew, Bruford, Fripp, Gunn, Levin, Mastelotto) (Live at the Metropolitan Theater, Mexico City, Mexico, August 1996) – 5:03
 "Neurotica" (Belew, Bruford, Fripp, Levin) (Live at the Metropolitan Theater, Mexico City, Mexico, August 1996) – 3:39
 "Prism" (Abridged) (Pierre Favre) (Live at the Metropolitan Theater, Mexico City, Mexico, August 1996) – 2:54
 "One Time" (Belew, Bruford, Fripp, Gunn, Levin, Mastelotto) (Live at Prix D'Ami, Buenos Aires, Argentina, 29 September 1994) – 6:53
 "Larks' Tongues in Aspic Part IV" (Including "Coda: I Have a Dream") (Belew, Fripp, Gunn, Mastelotto) (Live at the 328 Performance Hall, Nashville, Tennessee, 10 November 2001) – 10:47
 "ProzaKc Blues" (Belew, Fripp, Gunn, Mastelotto) (Live at the Kōsei Nenkin, Tokyo, Japan, 16 April 2003) – 5:28
 "the construKction of light" (Belew, Fripp, Gunn, Mastelotto) (Live at the Community Theater, Berkeley, California, 10 August 2001) – 8:39
 "FraKctured" (Belew, Fripp, Gunn, Mastelotto) (Live edit of: Amager Bio, Copenhagen, Denmark, 27 or 28 May 2000 & Museumplatz, Bonn, Germany, 6 June 2000) – 8:38
 "The World's My Oyster Soup Kitchen Floor Wax Museum" (Belew, Fripp, Gunn, Mastelotto) (Live at the Kōsei Nenkin, Tokyo, Japan, 16 April 2003) – 5:50
 "Sus-Tayn-Z" (ProjeKct Two) (Belew, Fripp, Gunn) (Live at Pearl Street, Northampton,  Massachusetts, 1 July 1998) – 7:51
 "X-chayn-jiZ" (ProjeKct Two) (Belew, Fripp, Gunn) (Live at Pearl Street, Northampton, Massachusetts, 1 July 1998) – 4:18
 "The Deception of the Thrush" (Abridged) (Belew, Fripp, Gunn, Mastelotto) (Live at Shepherd's Bush Empire, London, England, 3 July 2000) – 5:20
 "2ii3" (ProjeKct One) (Abridged) (Bruford, Fripp, Gunn, Levin) (Live at The Jazz Café, Camden Town, London, England, 2 December 1997) – 1:57
 Tracks 10–11 & 13 from The ProjeKcts (1999)
 Track 7 from the Level Five EP (2001)
 Tracks 1–3 from Vrooom Vrooom (2001)
 Track 5 from the Happy with What You Have to Be Happy With EP
 Tracks 6, 9, & 12 from Eyes Wide Open (2003)
 Tracks 4 & 8 previously unreleased

Personnel
 Robert Fripp – guitar, organ, Frippertronics, soundscapes, and mellotron on all tracks
 Adrian Belew – fretted/fretless guitars, lead vocals, and lyrics on all tracks
 Tony Levin – Chapman Stick, bass guitar, upright bass, synth, backing vocals on discs 1–2, disc 3, tracks 1–9, & disc 4, tracks 1–4
 Bill Bruford – acoustic and electronic drums on discs 1–2, disc 3, tracks 1–9, & disc 4, tracks 1–4
 Trey Gunn – Chapman Stick, bass touch guitar, baritone guitar, Warr guitar, fretless Warr guitar, and backing vocals on discs 3–4
 Pat Mastelotto – acoustic/electronic percussion and drum programming on discs 3–4

References

Albums produced by Robert Fripp
2005 compilation albums
2005 live albums
King Crimson compilation albums
King Crimson live albums
Discipline Global Mobile albums